Marshall Bus was an English builder of bus and coach bodies based in Cambridge. It was owned by the Marshall Group until sold in a management buyout in 2001.

History

Marshall Bus was established in the 1940s by David Marshall. In 1958 it bought the bus bodying business of Mulliners. During the 1960s it bodied many buses for British Electric Traction. It ceased manufacturing in the early 1980s.

In January 1992, Marshall Bus re-entered the bus bodying industry after purchasing the rights to the Duple Dartline from Carlyle Works. It also completed bodies on Iveco Ford 49.10s and Volvo B6s.

The company's most popular product was the Marshall Capital, which was a single-decker bus body built between 1997 and 2003. It was built on Dennis Dart SLF and MAN chassis.

In the 1990s, Marshalls performed overhauls on West Midlands Travel MCW Metrobuses. In 2001–02 Marshall rebuilt a number of AEC Routemasters for Transport for London.

In 2001 the business was sold by Marshall Special Vehicles in a management buyout. In 2002 Marshall was placed in administration and shortly after closed. MCV Bus and Coach bought the design rights for the Capital body and continued production for a short while before its successor, the MCV Stirling, was introduced.

Products
C16/C19 (from Carlyle)
C27 Dartline (from Duple/Carlyle)
C29 (from Carlyle)
C31
C32/C33
C35/C36/C37
C39 Capital
C43 Capital
Camair 80
Euro
Minibus

References

External links

Defunct bus manufacturers of the United Kingdom
Vehicle manufacturing companies disestablished in 2002
2002 disestablishments in England
British companies disestablished in 2002